Doctor Holly Goodhead is a fictional character from the James Bond franchise, portrayed by Lois Chiles. She does not appear in any of the Ian Fleming novels, only in the film version of Moonraker (1979), but her character is similar to that of Gala Brand, the female lead in the original novel Moonraker (1955).

Goodhead is a scientist and astronaut working undercover for the CIA on Sir Hugo Drax's Moonraker 5 space shuttle, to gather intelligence on Drax's plan to exterminate the human race. Bond is also working undercover in Drax's organization, for the British Secret Intelligence Service, and he meets Goodhead when she introduces him to a centrifugal force chamber, where astronauts get to grips with G-forces, and invites him to have a try. In her absence, however, Drax's henchman, Chang, tampers with the machine's controls to send it into overdrive; when Goodhead returns, Bond has nearly been killed. Bond later meets Goodhead in her hotel room and is able to guess her identity when he sees standard CIA gadgetry there. Bond and Goodhead are at first reluctant to work together, but they are working well as a team by the end of the film. 

Bond travels to Venice to investigate Venni Glass, a company named in some of Drax's plans. Bond spots Goodhead there and follows her before re-introducing himself. Later that evening, Bond has to deal with Chang, then pays Goodhead a visit, and they spend the night together.

After M tells Bond to take two weeks' leave, Bond travels to Rio de Janeiro, where he meets Goodhead once more. Jaws, who is now working for Drax, tries to kill them both on a cable car at Sugarloaf Mountain. They escape, but are then captured by other men of Drax's disguised as paramedics. Bond escapes from the ambulance speeding towards Drax's base, but leaves Goodhead behind.

Bond meets Goodhead again once Drax puts them under 'Moonraker 5' to be incinerated by the lift-off. They escape and are able to pilot 'Moonraker 6'. After following Drax to his space station, Goodhead and Bond listen to Drax's speech and leave. Jaws later captures them after the first globe is launched. Drax tells Bond about his plan about having perfect human beings on his earth, with no physical peculiarity or ugliness, but this is overheard by Jaws. He sees that because of his steel teeth, he will be betrayed alongside his girlfriend, Dolly, so turns on Drax and helps Bond and Goodhead to fight Drax's men. After Bond goes to defeat Drax, Goodhead helps him, and Dolly and Jaws get off the self-destructing space station, escaping on a pod of their own into Earth's atmosphere. Bond and Goodhead go after the globes, narrowly destroying them.  

The film ends with the representatives of the US and Britain tuning in to see Holly Goodhead and Bond making love. The previous Bond film, The Spy Who Loved Me, ends in the same way, and Anya Amasova was shocked by this development, but Goodhead is too happy to care.

Last Words: Oh James, take me around the world one more time.

Analysis
James Chapman suggests that the relationship between Bond and Goodhead represents the Special Relationship between Britain and the United States. Chapman also notes that Goodhead "possesses a narratively important skill which Bond does not: she is able to pilot the space shuttle that is necessary for them to reach Drax's space station".

Notes

External links 
Holly Goodhead and other Cast, universalexports.net

Bond girls
Fictional aviators
Fictional scientists
Fictional astronauts
Fictional secret agents and spies
Fictional Vassar College alumni
James Bond characters
Moonraker (film)
Fictional characters introduced in 1979